Bishramganj railway station is a railway station in Sipahijala district, Tripura. Its code is BHRM. It serves Bishramganj town. The station lies on the Lumding–Sabroom section, which comes under the Lumding railway division of the Northeast Frontier Railway. The segment from Agartala to Sabroom via Udaipur became operational on 3 October 2019.

Major trains

 55681/55682 Agartala–Garjee Passenger
 55683/55684 Garjee–Agartala Passenger

References

Railway stations in Sipahijala district
Lumding railway division
2016 establishments in Tripura